Tobias Schad (born 24 July 1991) is a German lightweight rower. He won a gold medal at the 2015 World Rowing Championships in Aiguebelette with the lightweight men's eight.

References

1991 births
Living people
German male rowers
World Rowing Championships medalists for Germany